Cédric Claverie (born 6 December 1976) is a French judoka.

Achievements

References

 Videos (judovision.org)

1976 births
Living people
French male judoka
Judoka at the 2004 Summer Olympics
Olympic judoka of France
Universiade medalists in judo
Universiade bronze medalists for France
Medalists at the 2001 Summer Universiade
20th-century French people
21st-century French people